Witteveen is a Dutch surname.

Witteveen may also refer to:
 Witteveen, De Wolden,  a hamlet in the municipality of De Wolden in the Netherlands
 Witteveen, Midden-Drenthe,  a village in the municipality of Midden-Drenthe in the Netherlands
 Witteveen-Kolk syndrome is a rare genetic disorder caused by mutation on the SIN3A gene in the long arm of chromosome 15